Chateau Bleu Motel is located in North Wildwood, Cape May County, New Jersey, United States, in an area now known as, and designated by the state of New Jersey as, the Wildwoods Shore Resort Historic District. The building was built in 1962 in the distinctive "Googie" or "Doo Wop" architectural style.  Googie details include the heart shaped swimming pool and the spikes (one of which is broken) at the entrance.  The motel was added to the National Register of Historic Places on March 25, 2004.

See also
National Register of Historic Places listings in Cape May County, New Jersey
Caribbean Motel
 List of motels

References

External links

Hotel buildings on the National Register of Historic Places in New Jersey
Hotel buildings completed in 1962
Buildings and structures in Cape May County, New Jersey
Motels in the United States
Googie architecture
Moderne architecture in the United States
North Wildwood, New Jersey
National Register of Historic Places in Cape May County, New Jersey
New Jersey Register of Historic Places